Verhoeven's giant tree rat (Papagomys theodorverhoeveni) is an extinct rat of subfamily Murinae that lived on Flores in Indonesia. It was judged to be extinct in 1996. However, experts believe that it died out before 1500 AD. The species is known only from several subfossil fragments. It was named after Dutch priest Theodor Verhoeven. A 1974 report of a recent specimen has been judged to represent P. armandvillei instead.

References

Further reading

Papagomys
Rats of Asia
Extinct rodents
Flores Island (Indonesia)
Rodents of Indonesia
Extinct animals of Indonesia
Extinct mammals of Asia
Holocene extinctions
Mammals described in 1981
Taxobox binomials not recognized by IUCN